This page lists all described species of the spider family Actinopodidae accepted by the World Spider Catalog :

Actinopus

Actinopus Perty, 1833
 A. anselmoi Miglio, Pérez-Miles & Bonaldo, 2020 — Brazil
 A. apalai Miglio, Pérez-Miles & Bonaldo, 2020 — Brazil
 A. apiacas Miglio, Pérez-Miles & Bonaldo, 2020 — Brazil
 A. argenteus Ríos-Tamayo & Goloboff, 2018 — Argentina
 A. ariasi Ríos-Tamayo & Goloboff, 2018 — Argentina
 A. azaghal Miglio, Pérez-Miles & Bonaldo, 2020 — Brazil
 A. balcarce Ríos-Tamayo & Goloboff, 2018 — Argentina
 A. bocaina Miglio, Pérez-Miles & Bonaldo, 2020 — Brazil
 A. buritiensis Miglio, Pérez-Miles & Bonaldo, 2020 — Brazil
 A. candango Miglio, Pérez-Miles & Bonaldo, 2020 — Brazil
 A. caraiba (Simon, 1889) — Venezuela
 A. castelo Miglio, Pérez-Miles & Bonaldo, 2020 — Brazil
 A. casuhati Ríos-Tamayo & Goloboff, 2018 — Argentina
 A. caxiuana Miglio, Pérez-Miles & Bonaldo, 2020 — Brazil
 A. clavero Ríos-Tamayo & Goloboff, 2018 — Argentina
 A. coboi Ríos-Tamayo, 2019 — Uruguay
 A. cochabamba Ríos-Tamayo, 2016 — Bolivia
 A. concinnus Miglio, Pérez-Miles & Bonaldo, 2020 — Venezuela
 A. confusus Miglio, Pérez-Miles & Bonaldo, 2020 
 A. cordobensis Ríos-Tamayo & Goloboff, 2018 — Argentina
 A. cornelli Miglio, Pérez-Miles & Bonaldo, 2020 — Brazil
 A. coylei Ríos-Tamayo & Goloboff, 2018 — Argentina
 A. crassipes (Keyserling, 1891) — Brazil, Paraguay, Argentina
 A. cucutaensis Mello-Leitão, 1941 — Colombia, Venezuela, Brazil
 A. dioi Miglio, Pérez-Miles & Bonaldo, 2020 — Brazil
 A. dubiomaculatus Mello-Leitão, 1923 — Brazil
 A. ducke Miglio, Pérez-Miles & Bonaldo, 2020 — Brazil
 A. echinus Mello-Leitão, 1949 — Brazil
 A. emas Miglio, Pérez-Miles & Bonaldo, 2020 — Brazil
 A. excavatus Ríos-Tamayo & Goloboff, 2018 — Argentina
 A. fernandezi Ríos-Tamayo, 2019 — Uruguay
 A. fractus Mello-Leitão, 1920 — Brazil
 A. gerschiapelliarum Ríos-Tamayo & Goloboff, 2018 — Uruguay, Argentina
 A. goloboffi Ríos-Tamayo, 2014 — Argentina
 A. guajara Miglio, Pérez-Miles & Bonaldo, 2020 — Brazil
 A. harti Pocock, 1895 — Trinidad
 A. harveyi Miglio, Pérez-Miles & Bonaldo, 2020 — Brazil
 A. hirsutus Miglio, Pérez-Miles & Bonaldo, 2020 — Brazil
 A. indiamuerta Ríos-Tamayo & Goloboff, 2018 — Argentina
 A. insignis (Holmberg, 1881) — Uruguay, Argentina
 A. ipioca Miglio, Pérez-Miles & Bonaldo, 2020 — Brazil
 A. itacolomi Miglio, Pérez-Miles & Bonaldo, 2020 — Brazil
 A. itapitocai Miglio, Pérez-Miles & Bonaldo, 2020 — Brazil
 A. itaqui Miglio, Pérez-Miles & Bonaldo, 2020 — Brazil
 A. jaboticatubas Miglio, Pérez-Miles & Bonaldo, 2020 — Brazil
 A. jamari Miglio, Pérez-Miles & Bonaldo, 2020 — Brazil
 A. laventana Miglio, Pérez-Miles & Bonaldo, 2020 — Uruguay, Argentina
 A. liodon (Ausserer, 1875) — Uruguay
 A. lomalinda Miglio, Pérez-Miles & Bonaldo, 2020 — Colombia, Guyana
 A. longipalpis C. L. Koch, 1842 — Uruguay, Argentina
 A. magnus Ríos-Tamayo & Goloboff, 2018 — Argentina
 A. mairinquensis Miglio, Pérez-Miles & Bonaldo, 2020 — Brazil
 A. mesa Miglio, Pérez-Miles & Bonaldo, 2020 — Brazil
 A. nattereri (Doleschall, 1871) — Brazil
 A. nigripes (Lucas, 1834) — Brazil
 A. obidos Miglio, Pérez-Miles & Bonaldo, 2020 — Brazil
 A. osbournei Miglio, Pérez-Miles & Bonaldo, 2020 — Brazil
 A. palmar Ríos-Tamayo & Goloboff, 2018 — Argentina
 A. pampa Ríos-Tamayo & Goloboff, 2018 — Argentina
 A. pampulha Miglio, Pérez-Miles & Bonaldo, 2020 — Brazil
 A. panguana Miglio, Pérez-Miles & Bonaldo, 2020 — Peru
 A. parafundulus Miglio, Pérez-Miles & Bonaldo, 2020 — Brazil
 A. paraitinga Miglio, Pérez-Miles & Bonaldo, 2020 — Brazil
 A. paranensis Mello-Leitão, 1920 — Brazil
 A. patagonia Ríos-Tamayo & Goloboff, 2018 — Argentina
 A. pertyi Lucas, 1843 — South America
 A. piceus (Ausserer, 1871) — Brazil
 A. pindapoy Miglio, Pérez-Miles & Bonaldo, 2020 — Argentina
 A. pinhao Miglio, Pérez-Miles & Bonaldo, 2020 — Brazil
 A. princeps Chamberlin, 1917 — Brazil
 A. puelche Ríos-Tamayo & Goloboff, 2018 — Uruguay, Argentina
 A. pusillus Mello-Leitão, 1920 — Brazil
 A. ramirezi Ríos-Tamayo & Goloboff, 2018 — Argentina
 A. reycali Ríos-Tamayo & Goloboff, 2018 — Argentina
 A. reznori Miglio, Pérez-Miles & Bonaldo, 2020 — Brazil
 A. robustus (O. Pickard-Cambridge, 1892) — Panama
 A. rojasi (Simon, 1889) — Venezuela
 A. rufibarbis Mello-Leitão, 1930 — Brazil
 A. rufipes (Lucas, 1834) — Brazil
 A. scalops (Simon, 1889) — Venezuela
 A. septemtrionalis Ríos-Tamayo & Goloboff, 2018 — Argentina
 A. simoi Ríos-Tamayo, 2019 — Uruguay
 A. szumikae Ríos-Tamayo & Goloboff, 2018 — Argentina
 A. taragui Ríos-Tamayo & Goloboff, 2018 — Argentina
 A. tarsalis Perty, 1833 (type) — Brazil
 A. trinotatus Mello-Leitão, 1938 — Brazil
 A. tutu Miglio, Pérez-Miles & Bonaldo, 2020 — Brazil
 A. urucui Miglio, Pérez-Miles & Bonaldo, 2020 — Brazil
 A. uruguayense Ríos-Tamayo, 2019 — Uruguay
 A. utinga Miglio, Pérez-Miles & Bonaldo, 2020 — Brazil
 A. valencianus (Simon, 1889) — Venezuela
 A. vilhena Miglio, Pérez-Miles & Bonaldo, 2020 — Brazil
 A. wallacei F. O. Pickard-Cambridge, 1896 — Brazil
 A. xenus Chamberlin, 1917 — South America
 A. xingu Miglio, Pérez-Miles & Bonaldo, 2020 — Brazil

Missulena

Missulena Walckenaer, 1805
 M. bradleyi Rainbow, 1914 — Australia (New South Wales)
 M. dipsaca Faulder, 1995 — Australia
 M. faulderi Harms & Framenau, 2013 — Australia (Western Australia)
 M. granulosa (O. Pickard-Cambridge, 1869) — Australia (Western Australia)
 M. harewoodi Framenau & Harms, 2017 — Australia (Western Australia)
 M. hoggi Womersley, 1943 — Australia (Western Australia)
 M. insignis (O. Pickard-Cambridge, 1877) — Australia
 M. langlandsi Harms & Framenau, 2013 — Australia (Western Australia)
 M. leniae Miglio, Harms, Framenau & Harvey, 2014 — Australia (Western Australia)
 M. mainae Miglio, Harms, Framenau & Harvey, 2014 — Australia (Western Australia)
 M. melissae Miglio, Harms, Framenau & Harvey, 2014 — Australia (Western Australia)
 M. occatoria Walckenaer, 1805 (type) — Southern Australia
 M. pinguipes Miglio, Harms, Framenau & Harvey, 2014 — Australia (Western Australia)
 M. pruinosa Levitt-Gregg, 1966 — Australia (Western Australia, Northern Territory)
 M. reflexa Rainbow & Pulleine, 1918 — Australia (South Australia)
 M. rutraspina Faulder, 1995 — Australia (Western Australia, South Australia, Victoria)
 M. torbayensis Main, 1996 — Australia (Western Australia)
 M. tussulena Goloboff, 1994 — Chile

Plesiolena

Plesiolena Goloboff & Platnick, 1987
 P. bonneti (Zapfe, 1961) (type) — Chile
 P. jorgelina Goloboff, 1994 — Chile

References

Actinopodidae